Haringhata is a town and a municipality of the Nadia district in the Indian state of West Bengal.

Geography

Location
It has an average elevation of 10 metres (33 feet).

Municipality
Haringhata, earlier a census town, was created a municipality in 2015.

Area overview
Nadia district is part of the large alluvial plain formed by the Ganges-Bhagirathi system. The Kalyani subdivision has the Bhagirathi/ Hooghly on the west. Topographically, Kalyani subdivision is a part of the Ranaghat-Chakdaha Plain, the low-lying area found in the south-eastern part of the district. The smallest subdivision in the district, area-wise, has the highest level of urbanisation in the district. 76.73% of the population lives in urban areas and 23.27% lives in the  rural areas.

Note: The map alongside presents some of the notable locations in the subdivision. All places marked in the map are linked in the larger full screen map. All the four subdivisions are presented with maps on the same scale – the size of the maps vary as per the area of the subdivision.

Civic administration

Police station
Haringhata police station has jurisdiction over Haringhata CD block. The total area covered by the police station is 170 km2 and the population covered is 229,825 (2001 census).

Demographics
According to the 2011 Census of India, Haringhata had a total population of 3,989, of which 1,971 (49%) were males and 2,018 (51%) were females. Population in the age range 0–6 years was 465. The total number of literate persons in Haringhata was 2,766 (78.49% of the population over 6 years).

Economy 
The Reliance group have  evinced interest in the Haringhata Dairy. They have plans to enter the food business.  Consultants have recommended that four government dairies be placed in the joint sector.

Education 
Bidhan Chandra Krishi Viswa Vidyalaya is located at Mohanpur, Haringhata.
West Bengal University Of Animal And Fishery Sciences is located at Mohanpur, Haringhata.
 Indian Institute of Science Education and Research, Kolkata, a scientific research institution, has built its permanent campus in Haringhata.
Haringhata Mahavidyalaya was established at Haringhata in 1986. Affiliated to the University of Kalyani, it offers honours courses in Bengali, English, geography, education, history, political science and accountancy.
 Maulana Abul Kalam Azad University of Technology is building its campus there.
 Barajaguli Gopal Academy, the most traditional century-old school in the area.

References 

Cities and towns in Nadia district